Clytie delunaris is a moth of the family Erebidae first described by Otto Staudinger in 1889. It is found in Central Asia, Mongolia, Afghanistan, Iran and Israel.

There is one generation per year. Adults are on wing from May to July.

The larvae probably feed on Tamarix species.

External links

Image

Ophiusina
Moths described in 1889
Moths of Asia